XHUIA-FM is a radio station in Mexico City. Owned by the Universidad Iberoamericana through licensee Radio Ibero, A.C., XHUIA-FM broadcasts on 90.9 MHz and carries a mixed college radio format under the name "Ibero 90.9".

XHUIA-FM broadcasts in HD and carries two subchannels, known as Ibero 90.9.1 and Ibero 90.9.2.

History
In 1991, the university began to seek a permit for a radio station primarily used for teaching purposes. At that time, the Secretariat of Communications and Transportation assigned a provisional permit for XHUIB-FM, broadcasting with 20 watts. The station grew in the 1990s; it received a power hike 100 watts ERP by 1994 and broadcasting 40 hours a week, while in July 1996, the current XHUIA-FM callsign was adopted. The station was primarily programmed by students at the university; the programs and format were free-flowing.

On September 25, 2001, the SCT authorized a power increase to 3 kW. The university also formalized the station's management (under a civil association) and programming, which led to the station's relaunch as Radio Ibero on March 7, 2003.

In December 2018, the IFT approved an increase to 10 kW for the station, expanding service particularly in areas to the north and east of Mexico City.

References

External links  

 Official site of XHUIA-FM 90.9 MHz, Ibero 90.9 Radio

Radio stations in Mexico City
University radio stations in Mexico
Universidad Iberoamericana